William Ricciardi (12 July 1871 – 16 February 1961) was an Italian actor known for his role as Signor Baldini in San Francisco (1936). He also appeared in the Phil Rosen film The Heart of a Siren (1926). In Anthony Adverse (1936) he had a splendid cameo as the talkative coachman who converses with Adverse, played by Fredric March.

William Ricciardi and Francesco Saverio were introduced by the actor Francesco De Maio and in 1889 they decided to initiate their own theatre circle. Tony Perry thought of Ricciardi for Tom in Child of Manhattan.

He also played stage roles in The Great Lover as Farnald. He played Joe Malatesta in Mr. Malatesta for 97 performances. Tomasso was performed in Strictly Dishonourable (1929) 557 times.

Filmography

References

External links
 

1871 births
1961 deaths
20th-century Italian male actors
Italian male silent film actors
19th-century Italian male actors
Italian male stage actors